Henry Chukwuemeka Onyekuru (born 5 June 1997) is a Nigerian professional footballer who plays as a winger for Turkish Süper Lig club Adana Demirspor, on loan from Olympiacos, and the Nigeria national team.

Club career

Eupen
Onyekuru began his football career with the Aspire Academy in 2010, and graduated in 2015 joining their partner club, K.A.S. Eupen. He made his debut for Eupen on 5 September 2015 in a 2–2 tie against K.F.C. Dessel Sport in the Belgian Second Division. Onyekuru helped the team get promoted to the Belgian First Division A in his debut season, and made his professional debut in a 3–0 loss on 30 July 2016 against S.V. Zulte Waregem. After a successful season in the Belgium first division, Onyekuru finished as one of the top scorers in the league, catching the attention of various larger teams in Europe. He finished the 2016–17 season as joint top-scorer with 22 goals, but the trophy was handed to Łukasz Teodorczyk as he scored more away goals than Onyekuru.

Everton
On 30 June 2017, Onyekuru joined Everton for £7 million and was immediately sent on loan to Anderlecht. Onyekuru had been handed the number 9 jersey at Anderlecht for the 2017–18 campaign.

Having scored 10 goals in 28 matches for Anderlecht, Onyekuru suffered a knee ligament injury in December which would require surgery. Anderlecht announced surgery would be necessary and that he would be out of action "for several months". In January 2018, it was reported that Onyekuru would return to Anderlecht after rehabilitation and full recovery.

Loan to Galatasaray 
In July 2018, Onyekuru joined Galatasaray on a season-long loan. The loan fee paid to Everton was reported as £700,000. On 20 May 2019, Onyekuru was on the scoresheet for Galatasaray as they defeated title challengers İstanbul Başakşehir 2–1 to secure the Süper Lig championship for the second straight season. The victory also meant that Galatasaray secured the domestic double having defeated Akhisar Belediyespor in the Turkish Cup final the week prior.

Monaco 
Having failed to ever secure a work permit in the UK, Onyekuru joined AS Monaco on a permanent transfer on 12 August 2019. The fee was undisclosed (rumoured to be between £12-£15 million) and Onyekuru signed a five-year deal with the Ligue 1 club.

Return to Galatasaray on loan 
On 5 January 2020, Onyekuru signed for Galatasaray, his former club, on a six-month loan with no option to buy. He left after his loan ended in June, making a total of twelve appearances and scoring one goal.

On 25 January 2021, Onyekuru once again signed for Galatasaray on a six-month loan, this time with an option to buy.

Olympiacos 
On 2 August 2021, Olympiacos announced the signing of Onyekuru for a four-year deal for an undisclosed amount.

International career
Onyekuru was called up for the Super Eagles camp in May 2017. He made his senior debut for Nigeria in a 3–0 friendly win over Togo on 1 June 2017.

After a strong 2018–19 club season with Galatasaray, Onyekuru was included in Nigeria's final 23-man squad for the 2019 Africa Cup of Nations in Egypt. He played for 12 minutes at the finals, coming on as a late substitute in their 1–2 semi-final defeat to eventual champions Algeria.

Onyekuru was invited by the national coach as part of the squad to face Ukraine in an international friendly on the 10 of September 2019.

Career statistics

Club

International

Scores and results list Nigeria's goal tally first, score column indicates score after each Onyekuru goal.

Honours
Anderlecht
 Belgian Super Cup: 2017

Galatasaray
 Süper Lig: 2018–19
 Turkish Cup: 2018–19

Olympiacos

Super League Greece: 2021–22

References

External links

 
 
 
 
 Profile at the Everton F.C. website
 Onyekuru Eupen Profile
 Onyekuru Maxifoot Profile

1997 births
Living people
People from Onitsha
Association football forwards
Nigerian footballers
Nigeria international footballers
K.A.S. Eupen players
R.S.C. Anderlecht players
Everton F.C. players
Galatasaray S.K. footballers
AS Monaco FC players
Olympiacos F.C. players
Adana Demirspor footballers
Süper Lig players
Belgian Pro League players
Challenger Pro League players
Super League Greece players
Nigerian expatriate footballers
Expatriate footballers in Belgium
Nigerian expatriate sportspeople in Belgium
Expatriate footballers in Turkey
Nigerian expatriate sportspeople in Turkey
Expatriate footballers in Monaco
Nigerian expatriate sportspeople in Monaco
Expatriate footballers in Greece
Nigerian expatriate sportspeople in Greece
Aspire Academy (Senegal) players
2019 Africa Cup of Nations players
2021 Africa Cup of Nations players